Marston is an unincorporated community in Richmond County, North Carolina, United States. Marston had its own post office until November 13, 2010; it still has its own ZIP code, 28363. Marston also gave its name to the pierced steel planks developed and deployed by the U.S. military in World War Two called ‘Marston mats’. During November, 1941 maneuvers near Marston, North Carolina, the 21st Engineer Regiment (Aviation) constructed a 3,000 foot runway in eleven days using eighteen railway carloads of 36,000 panels of pierced steel planking. Developed by the Carnegie Illinois Steel Company, the 10 foot by 15 inch steel panels, with 87 holes, weighed 66.2 pounds each, and could be emplaced without special tools, then lifted and moved to a new location.

References

Unincorporated communities in Richmond County, North Carolina
Unincorporated communities in North Carolina